Two Run is an unincorporated community in Clay County, West Virginia, United States. It is located along Palestine Road, and is approximately 60 miles northeast of Charleston.

References 

Unincorporated communities in West Virginia
Unincorporated communities in Clay County, West Virginia
Charleston, West Virginia metropolitan area